Parenago is an impact crater on the Moon's far side, behind the eastern limb. Nearly attached to the east-southeastern outer rim of Parengo is the crater Berkner. To the south-southwest lies Comrie.

This is a worn and eroded crater formation. Attached to the northern outer rim are the satellite craters Parenago W and Parenago Z. Three small craters lie prominently along the edge the inner wall in the southeast quadrant of the interior floor. The floor is otherwise relatively level and is marked by only a few tiny craterlets.

Satellite craters
By convention these features are identified on lunar maps by placing the letter on the side of the crater midpoint that is closest to Parenago.

References

 
 
 
 
 
 
 
 
 
 
 
 

Impact craters on the Moon